Fatos Tarifa (born 21 August 1954) is a social scientist and a former diplomat from Albania.

Education
Tarifa has a double doctorate, with a Ph.D. in Sociology from the University of North Carolina at Chapel Hill and a doctorate in Political Science from the University of Tirana. He has been, inter alia, a lecturer, a researcher and a distinguished visiting fellow since 1981, when he joined the School of Political Science and Law at the University of Tirana. In 1992 he was awarded a Fulbright Fellowship at the Department of Sociology at UNC Chapel Hill, North Carolina.

Career
Tarifa served as Albanian ambassador to the Netherlands (1998–2001) and to the United States (2001–2005). Currently he is Professor of Sociology and International Relations, and Director of the Institute for Studies on Democracy and Development at the University of New York Tirana. Tarifa has taught and conducted research at the University of Tirana, the European University of Tirana, the Institute of Social Studies at The Hague, Webster University (Leiden, the Netherlands), Campbell University, the University of North Carolina at Chapel Hill, and Eastern Michigan University and he has delivered lectures at institutions of higher education throughout the world, such as Duke University, Stanford University, New York University, Harvard University, Brown University, the University of California at Berkeley, Tufts University, the University of Essex, and the University of Amsterdam.

Tarifa has authored, co-authored and edited 45 books and more than 90 journal articles. His books and articles have covered topics ranging from democratic transition and social issues in Eastern Europe to Human development, and current international affairs. In 1998 he became the founding Editor of "Sociological Analysis", an innovative, international scholarly journal published at Chapel Hill, NC, which he edited for 15 years. He serves as a member of the International Advisory Board of the "Journal of Social Sciences" and the "Journal of Applied Social Science".

Dr. Tarifa will probably be best remembered as the leader of a campaign to introduce the discipline of sociology into higher education in Albania. He is widely considered to be "the founder of sociological studies in Albania, and one of the country's most prominent social scientists". Tarifa has "already earned the title of father of Albanian sociology, a moniker he has generally resisted".

Main publications
 The First Decade and After (2000) – 
 The Breakdown of State Socialism and the Emerging Post-Socialist Order (2001) – 
 Culture, Ideology, and Society (2001) – 
 The Quest for Legitimacy and the Withering Away of Utopia (2001) – 
 The Balkans: A Mission neither Accomplished nor Impossible (2002) – 
 To Albania, with Love (2007) – 
 Europe Adrift on the Wine-Dark Sea (2007) – 
  [Social Life as Sociological Experience] (2007) – 
  [The Tale of Two Continents] (2007) – 
 Vengeance is Mine: Justice Albanian Style (2008) – 
  [Americanophobia and Anti-Americanism in Europe] (2008) – 
  [Ununited Europe] (2009) – 
  [The Paradigm of Democratic Transition] (2009) – 
  [The Defeated Warriors of the anti-Kadare Crusade] (2010) – 
  [Europe's Renaissance] (2010) – 
  [The Fate of a Century] (2010) – 
 Letters to America / Letra Amerikes (2011) – 
  [The Dynamics of Pluralizing Modernity] (2012) - 
  [Politics and History] (2012) - 
  [Knowledge, the University, and Democracy] (2012) - 
  [The Impossibility of the European Project] (2013) - 
  [The Sciences of Society: Sociology as an Integrative Discipline for the Study of Social Life] with a Foreword by Anthony Giddens (2013) - 
  [Clash of Civilizations? Radical Islam in Historical and Political Contexts] (2013) - 
  [Higher Education for an Open Society] (2013) - 
  [Politics as Grammar and Metaphor] (2014) - 
  [The Sociological Imagination and Our Social World] (2014) - 
  [A World Loaded for the 21st Century] (2014) - 
 Bona fide (2014) - 
  [Vengeance is Mine: The Social Morphology and Moral Grammar of Vengeance] (2014)

Sources
.

.

1954 births
Living people
20th-century Albanian writers
University of Tirana alumni
University of North Carolina at Chapel Hill alumni
Ambassadors of Albania to the Netherlands
Date of birth missing (living people)
Ambassadors of Albania to the United States
Academic staff of the University of Tirana
21st-century Albanian writers
Albanian male writers
Albanian-language writers
Campbell University faculty
University of North Carolina at Chapel Hill faculty
Eastern Michigan University faculty
Academic staff of the International Institute of Social Studies
Albanian social sciences writers
20th-century male writers